Tetragonoderus deuvei is a species of beetle in the family Carabidae. It was described by Shpeley & Ball in 2008.

References

deuvei
Beetles described in 2008